Events from the year 1758 in Russia

Incumbents
 Monarch – Elizabeth

Events

 January 22 – Seven Years' War – 34,000 Russian soldiers capture Königsberg in East Prussia (modern-day Kaliningrad).
  February 14 – Vice Chancellor Aleksey Bestuzhev-Ryumin was removed from office.
 August 25 – Seven Years' War – Wilhelm Fermor's troops are defeated by Frederick near the Oder during the Battle of Zorndorf.
 Seven Years' War – Russia made a failed attempt to take Kolberg in Pomerania (modern-day Kołobrzeg, Poland).

Births

 Euphrosinia Kolyupanovskaya, courtier (d. 1855)
 Ekaterina Orlova (courtier), courtier (d. 1781)

Deaths

 August 17 – Stepan Fyodorovich Apraksin, Russian soldier (b. 1702)
 September 5 – Dmitry Ivanovich Vinogradov, Russian chemist (b. c. 1720)

References

1758 in Russia
Years of the 18th century in the Russian Empire